William Leiss  (born 1939) is an American-Canadian academic who served as president of the Royal Society of Canada from 1999 to 2001.

Born on Long Island, New York, at the end of 1939, he grew up in rural Pennsylvania. He began his university education in New Jersey, at Fairleigh Dickinson University, graduating in 1956 with a Bachelor of Arts degree summa cum laude (major in history and minor in accounting); then in Massachusetts, with a Master of Arts degree in the history of ideas program at Brandeis University (1963); and finally with a Doctor of Philosophy degree in philosophy from the University of California, San Diego (1969). Leiss studied with Herbert Marcuse at the University of California.

Leiss started his academic career in the political science department at the University of Regina, before moving on in 1973 to two stints with the Faculty of Environmental Studies at York University (also political science and the graduate programme in social and political thought there), interrupted by a brief stay at the University of Toronto's Department of Sociology; then in 1980 to the School of Communication at Simon Fraser University, where he was department chair for six years and later Vice-President, Research. He was awarded the five-year, externally funded Eco-Research Chair in Environmental Policy at the School of Policy Studies, Queen's University, in 1994 and was then  in the Faculty of Management at the University of Calgary where he held a five-year research chair, the NSERC/SSHRC/Industry Chair in Risk Communication and Public Policy, funded under the granting councils' Management of Technological Change program. He is now at the University of Ottawa, in the R. Samuel McLaughlin Centre for Population Health Risk Assessment as Scientist and Adjunct Professor.

His work on risk communication in science and policy has informed recent analysis on biotechnology governance in Canada by political scientists G. Bruce Doern and Michael J. Prince.

In 2003, he was made an Officer of the Order of Canada.

Publications
 "Husserl's Crisis". Telos 8 (Summer 1971). New York: Telos Press.
 The Domination of Nature, first published in 1972
 The Limits to Satisfaction (1976)
 Social Communication in Advertising (1986)
 C. B. Macpherson: Dilemmas of Liberalism and Socialism, Second Edition (2009)
 Under Technology's Thumb (1990)
 Risk and Responsibility (1994)
 Mad Cows and Mother's Milk (1997)
 In the Chamber of Risks (2001)
 Hera (2006)
 The Doom Loop in the Financial Sector, & Other Black Holes of Risk (2010)

References
 
 
 Interview with CTheory.net

External links
 

1939 births
20th-century American male writers
20th-century Canadian male writers
21st-century American male writers
21st-century Canadian male writers
Academics from New York (state)
Academics from Pennsylvania
American expatriate academics
American expatriate writers in Canada
American male non-fiction writers
Brandeis University alumni
Canadian male non-fiction writers
Fairleigh Dickinson University alumni
Fellows of the Royal Society of Canada
Living people
Officers of the Order of Canada
People from Long Island
Academic staff of the Queen's University at Kingston
Academic staff of Simon Fraser University
Academic staff of the University of Calgary
University of California, San Diego alumni
Academic staff of the University of Regina
Academic staff of the University of Toronto
Academic staff of York University